Through the Eyes of Tomorrow is a Canadian variety and public affairs television series for youth which aired on CBC Television from 1966 to 1969.

Premise
This series combined journalism, music and drama for a youth audience.

During its first run in 1966, the series was hosted by Paul Saltzman and Janet McQuillin. Each episode featured a given theme such as music, sex, drugs or overseas work. Personalities such as Peter Kastner, Richard J. Needham and Ed Thigpen appeared during the 1966 season.

In the following year, Saltzman continued with the series as a reporter and writer. However, episodes featured a changing roster of numerous hosts such as Rex Hagon and Jennifer Leak. Featured subjects included the Company of Young Canadians,  Expo 67 and the Vietnam War.

The 1968 episodes were hosted by Brant Frayne, Carol Hunter and Wayne Thompson.

The final episodes in 1969, hosted by Stephen Foster, included an interview with Jimi Hendrix.

Scheduling
This series was broadcast on Sunday afternoons for an hour in the 1966 season, the half-hour episodes for the remaining seasons.

References

External links
 

CBC Television original programming
1966 Canadian television series debuts
1969 Canadian television series endings
1960s Canadian variety television series
1960s Canadian television news shows